= Robert Verrue =

Robert Verrue (14 November 1947 – 26 September 2012) was an official of the European Commission. He has served as Director-General of the Directorate-General for Employment (from 2008), Director-General for Taxation & Customs Union (2002–2008) and Director-General for Information Society (1996–2002).

After receiving a degree in business management in 1968, he attended the College of Europe (international economics) 1968–1969. He has a Master in Business Administration from INSEAD, where he studied 1970–1971. He joined the Directorate-General for Economic and Financial Affairs of the European Commission as a junior economist in 1973. He served as director at the Directorate-General for Industrial Affairs and Internal Market 1988–1993 and Deputy Director General at the Directorate-General for External Affairs 1993–1995, responsible for relations with Central European Countries and CIS Republics.
